The Orang Laut are several seafaring ethnic groups and tribes living around Singapore, peninsular Malaysia and the Indonesian Riau Islands.  The Orang Laut are commonly identified as the Orang Seletar from the Straits of Johor, but the term may also refer to any Malayic-speaking people living on coastal islands, including those of Mergui Archipelago islands of Myanmar and Thailand, commonly known as Moken.

Etymology
The Malay term  literally means 'sea peoples'. The Orang Laut live and travel in their boats on the sea. They made their living from fishing and collecting sea products. Another Malay term for them,  (literally 'Straits people'), was brought into European languages as Celates.

Distribution
 
Broadly speaking, the term  encompasses the numerous tribes and groups inhabiting the islands and estuaries in the Riau-Lingga archipelagos, the Pulau Tujuh Islands, the Batam Archipelago, and the coasts and offshore islands of eastern Sumatra, southern Malaysia Peninsula and Singapore.

History

Historically, the Orang Laut played major roles in Srivijaya, the Sultanate of Malacca, and the Sultanate of Johor. They patrolled the adjacent sea areas, repelling real pirates, directing traders to their employers' ports and maintaining those ports' dominance in the area  In return, the ruler gave Orang Laut leaders prestigious titles and gifts. The earliest description of the Orang Laut may have been by the 14th century Chinese traveler Wang Dayuan who described the inhabitants of Temasek (present day Singapore) in his work Daoyi Zhilüe.

Popular culture

In the story The Disturber of Traffic by Rudyard Kipling, a character called Fenwick misrenders the Orang Laut as "Orange-Lord" and the narrator character corrects him that they are the "Orang-Laut".

See also

Piracy in the Strait of Malacca
Orang Laut in Singapore
Urak Lawoi’ people
Sampan panjang, Orang Laut racing boat
Loncong language

References

External links

 Pirates of the East
 Where the spirits roam
 Riau in Transition
 1400s - The Orang Laut Warriors - a short documentary about the Orang Laut in the 15th - 17th century, produced for the Singapore Bicentennial in 2019.

Ethnic groups in Indonesia
Ethnic groups in Sumatra
Ethnic groups in Malaysia
Ethnic groups in Singapore
 
Modern nomads